Wietrzychowice  is a village in Tarnów County, Lesser Poland Voivodeship, in southern Poland. It is the seat of the gmina (administrative district) called Gmina Wietrzychowice.

References

Villages in Tarnów County
Kraków Voivodeship (1919–1939)